The Winchester Model 71 was a lever-action rifle introduced in 1935 and discontinued in 1958.

Description
A slightly modified version of the Browning designed Winchester Model 1886, it was only chambered for the .348 Winchester round;  except for an extremely rare .45-70 Government and .33 WCF. It was also (other than 400 rifles chambered for the .348 in the Cimarron 1885 Hi-Wall in 2005-06) the only firearm that ever used that cartridge.  The Model 71 was conceived as a replacement for both the Model 1886 and Model 1895 as a complement to the Winchester Model 70 bolt-action rifle and to replace a raft of cartridges (the .33 Winchester, the .45-70, the .35 Winchester, and the .405 Winchester) with just one (the .348 Winchester).  The rifle and cartridge were very effective against any North American big game in heavy timber, including the great bears, if using the  bullet.  It was once very popular for hunting in Canada and Alaska.

Unfortunately, economics caused the rifle to be very expensive, and with less costly lever action rifles available in common and fairly powerful rounds such as .35 Remington, and the growing popularity of cheap bolt-actions in military and Magnum chamberings, the Winchester 71 with its excellent but unique cartridge was destined for commercial oblivion.   The .348 was also the only 34 caliber cartridge ever made by an American manufacturer  and essentially the first short magnum cartridge, making it a little problematic for handloaders, as there was never a wide selection of 34 caliber bullets.

Cartridges of the World remarks that factory ammunition was available in 150, 200 and  weights.  Only the  weight is still available in factory ammunition.

Browning re-issued the Model 71 as a limited edition in the mid 1980s. The Winchester and Browning versions showed very high degrees of craftsmanship.

As of August, 2013, the Winchester Repeating Arms website again lists model 71s as available, new from the factory.

The Winchester Model 71 still has a loyal following for what is arguably "the finest big bore lever gun that has ever been" as well as being used as a strong and solid platform for various 'wildcat' projects.

Sources
 The Cody Firearms Museum research office
 Barnes, F, Cartridges of the World
 Madis, George, The Winchester Book. Houson: Arts and Leisure Press, 1971.

References 

Lever-action rifles
Winchester Repeating Arms Company firearms